John Mokoenga Tikaka Henry (born c. 1959) is a Cook Islands politician and member of the Cook Islands Parliament.  He is a member of the Cook Islands Party.

Henry is a nephew of former Prime Minister of the Cook Islands Sir Geoffrey Henry.  He has previously worked as a civil servant in the Ministry of Internal Affairs.  He was elected at the 2010 election as MP for Avatiu–Ruatonga–Palmerston.

In February 2011 he was elected as Deputy Speaker of the Cook Islands Parliament.  In May 2011 he was made associate minister of finance and internal affairs.

Henry lost his seat at the 2014 election, losing to Albert Nicholas. When Nicholas was forced to resign from Parliament after being expelled from the Democratic Party, Henry contested the 2017 Avatiu–Ruatonga–Palmerston by-election as an independent but was unsuccessful.

References

Living people
Members of the Parliament of the Cook Islands
Cook Islands Party politicians
Government ministers of the Cook Islands
John
Year of birth missing (living people)